Merodach may refer to :

Bel-Merodach (or Merodach) an alternative name of Marduk, a Mesopotamian god.
Evil-Merodach, an alternative name for Amel-Marduk, the son and successor of Nebuchadnezzar II, king of Babylon.
Merodach Baladan, (or Marduk-apla-iddina), the name of two kings of Babylonia
Merodach (Dungeons & Dragons), name of a devil in the Dungeons & Dragons role playing game